The Smarty Jones Stakes is a Listed American Thoroughbred horse race for 3-year-olds contested on dirt at a distance of one mile (8 furlongs) run annually in mid-January at Oaklawn Park Race Track in Hot Springs, Arkansas.  The Smarty Jones is worth $150,000.

History

Named for the 2004 Kentucky Derby and Preakness Stakes winner, Smarty Jones, the inaugural race was held on January 21, 2008.

It is the first in a series of races – including the Southwest Stakes, Rebel Stakes, and Arkansas Derby – held at Oaklawn that are commonly used as preps for the Kentucky Derby.

Note that a second Smarty Jones Stakes, a Grade 3 race for 3-year-olds run at a distance of 1 and 1/16 miles, was created in 2010 and is held at Parx in late August or during Labor Day weekend.

Since 2013 the event is part of the Road to the Kentucky Derby with qualification points given to the first four placegetters.

Records
Speed record:
 1:36.32 – Uncontested (2017)

Speed record:
  lengths - Caddo River (2021)

Most wins by a jockey:
 2 – Eusebio Razo Jr. (2008, 2011)
 2 – Jon Court (2013, 2016)

Most wins by a trainer:
 2 – William H. Fires (2016, 2019)
 2 – Brad H. Cox (2021, 2023)

Most wins by an owner:
 2 – Robert V. LaPenta (2015, 2017)
 2 – Harry T. Rosenblum (2015, 2017)

Winners

See also
Road to the Kentucky Derby

References

Graded stakes races in the United States
Horse races in Arkansas
Flat horse races for three-year-olds
Recurring sporting events established in 2008
Oaklawn Park
2008 establishments in Arkansas
Triple Crown Prep Races